Ruth Madeley (born 1987) is a British actress known for her roles in Years and Years and The Rook. She was born with spina bifida and has worked with the charity Whizz-Kidz for much of her life. She was nominated for a television BAFTA in 2016 for her work in Don't Take My Baby.

Early life
Madeley was born in Westhoughton, and was diagnosed with spina bifida six weeks before she was born. She has an older sister named Liz. Her father worked in customer services and her mother was a nurse. When Madeley was 5 years old, the charity Whizz-Kidz provided funding for a custom wheelchair for her. Madeley actively volunteered for Whizz-Kidz throughout her childhood and was part of the Kidz Board youth panel. As part of her work with Whizz-Kidz, at age 13, she visited Cherie Blair at 10 Downing Street to discuss fundraising and awareness. At age 14, she received another wheelchair from the charity.

At age 13, while a student at Mount St. Joseph, Farnworth, she was awarded the Princess Diana Memorial Award for young people. In 2004, at age 17, she was awarded the first Bolton Wanderers' Community Hero award.

Madeley matriculated at Thornleigh Salesian College and later studied English and creative writing with a focus on scriptwriting at Edge Hill University.

Career
In 2012, Madeley wrote and starred in the Lime Pictures TV movie Scrims. She has had several supporting roles in television, including Fresh Meat and The Level.

She starred as Anna in the 2015 TV movie Don't Take My Baby, chronicling a disabled couple's fight to prevent their baby from being taken away, and was nominated for a Best Actress TV BAFTA for her performance. The following year, she was listed as one of BAFTA's 18 Breakthrough Brits. At the time of filming, Madeley was working in fundraising at WhizzKids. She returned to the job after her BAFTA win, thinking there would not be enough roles for disabled actresses for her to make a career in acting.

In Russell T Davies' 2019 BBC/HBO miniseries, Years and Years, Madeley played Rosie Lyons. The role of Rosie was not originally written for a wheelchair user, but after her audition, Davies decided to work with Madeley to reshape the role around her spina bifida. Madeley took a six-month sabbatical from her job at WhizzKids to film the role. When she attempted to return to the job, she found she had landed another acting role. Madeley asked her boss if she could extend the sabbatical but her boss assured her that the sabbatical did not make sense as she was "an actress now".

Also in 2019, she played Ingrid Woodhouse in the television adaptation of Daniel O'Malley's The Rook.

In 2019, Madeley signed an open letter urging Hollywood executives to normalize disability by casting disabled actors to play disabled characters. In 2020, she appeared in the Christmas special episode of Would I Lie to You? and appeared in Mat Fraser's CripTales, a collection of disability monologues. In 2021, she competed on Celebrity Best Home Cook and played Throat in the television adaptation of Terry Pratchett's Discworld novel, The Watch.

In 2021, she was cast in the BBC One comedy series, The Cleaner and starred as Barbara Lisicki in the 2022 BBC Two drama, Then Barbara Met Alan. She will also appear in Tom Stern and Celyn Jones' film, The Almond and The Seahorse, inspired by Kaite O'Reilly's play of the same name.

Madeley's first theatre role was in The Greatest Wealth at The Old Vic in 2018. The Greatest Wealth consisted of seven monologues and was put together in celebration of the 70th anniversary of the NHS. Madeley's monologue, "Choice & Control" was written by Matilda Ibini. In late 2019 and early 2020, she played Barbara 'Buck' Buckingham in Teenage Dick at the Donmar Warehouse directed by Michael Longhurst. The play, written by Mike Lew, was inspired by Shakespeare's Richard III. The character of Buck was based on the character of the Duke of Buckingham and was explicitly written to be played by a disabled actor.

In September 2021, it was announced that she would star alongside Colin Baker and Bonnie Langford in the Big Finish Doctor Who audio dramas as a new companion of the Sixth Doctor, marine biologist Hebe Harrison. The boxset, The Sixth Doctor Adventures: Water Worlds, was released in May 2022. She was cast as Shirley Ann Bingham in the television series' 2023 specials, which were written by Davies, who has returned as showrunner.

Madeley and Ruben Reuter appeared in a documentary from Channel 4 on disability and abortion titled Disability and Abortion: The Hardest Choice. The documentary aired in August 2022.

Personal life
Madeley continues her work with Whizz-Kidz as a fundraiser and, in 2019, was recognized as a patron of the charity.

She has been with her partner, Joe, since 2012. The two have known each other since they were young.

Filmography

Film

Television

Theatre
 2018: Performed "Choice & Control" monologue in The Greatest Wealth
 2019–2020: Barbara 'Buck' Buckingham in Teenage Dick

Awards

References

External links
 

British film actresses
English film actresses
British television actresses
English television actresses
Living people
People with spina bifida
1987 births
Actors with disabilities
British stage actresses
English stage actresses
20th-century British actresses
Alumni of Edge Hill University
21st-century British actresses
People educated at Thornleigh Salesian College
People from Westhoughton
Actresses from Lancashire
Actors from Bolton
Wheelchair users
20th-century English women
20th-century English people
21st-century English women
21st-century English people